Northbrook High School (NHS) is a high School in Spring Branch, Houston, Texas. The school is one of four zoned high schools that are part of the Spring Branch Independent School District. Northbrook provides courses in the traditional academic subjects, as well as several foreign languages such as Spanish and French, athletics, and fine arts. Several different Advanced Placement (AP) courses are offered at Northbrook.

History
Northbrook High School was established in 1973 at Spring Woods High School's Campus in the T-Shacks. Northbrook High School's Campus opened during the 1974–1975 school year to ease overcrowding at Spring Branch and Spring Woods High Schools. When a dwindling student population caused Spring Branch High School to close in 1985, Northbrook took in a large number of Spring Branch students.

Northbrook was named a 1988-89 National Blue Ribbon School.

In 2005, Northbrook received 'Academically Acceptable' as the Texas Education Agency Accountability Rating.

In 2020 Spring Branch Independent School District acquired  of formerly commercial land so it could build a detention pond to control flooding.

Athletics

Northbrook competes athletically with other schools in the sports of baseball, basketball, cross country, diving, football, golf, soccer, softball, swimming, tennis, track & field and volleyball. Northbrook has a long-standing rivalry with fellow SBISD high school Spring Woods Senior High School.

Football

Northbrook has never been to the playoffs in football in the school's history. The best football record was set during the 1981 season with a 7–3 record under then head coach Bob French, who was the offensive coordinator for the '78 Texas 4A State Champion Stratford Spartans.

The Raiders first head coach was Horace "Buzzy" Allert. He was head coach from the school's first season in 1974 until the 1979 football season. He was forced to retire due to knee problems he obtained during his playing days in the NFL and CFL. Coach Allert finished his career at Northbrook with a 28–29–3 record, with his best season record at NHS was a 6-3-1 in '75 & '76.

After Coach Allert, Coach Bob French came in from Stratford two years after being part of the 1978 Stratford Coaching Staff. Bob French finished his career at Northbrook with a 27–29–4 record, with his best season at NHS being the school record 7–3 in 1981. After French came Coach Howell Ferguson, whom finished his career at NHS with a 20–38–1 record, with his best season being in 1988 with a 6–3 record, Northbrook's 2nd best season ever.  One game was cancelled due to Hurricane Gilbert.  The 1988 team fell one game short of the state playoffs by losing to Katy 21–9 late in the season.

Coach Hernandez followed after Ferguson and finished his career at NHS after only 3 seasons with an 11–19 record; his best season at NHS was a 6–4 record in 1993. L.P. Jones took over at Northbrook in 1995 and stayed until 1998 finishing at NHS with an overall record of 10–30, with his best season being a 4–6 in '97.

Pat Alvarado took over at Northbrook from 1999 to 2005. Alvarado finished his career at NHS with a 9–61 record with his best two seasons being in 2000 & 2001 with a 3–7 record. After going 0–10 for two consecutive seasons in 2004 and 2005 the Northbrook Raiders led by new head coach Craig Cripps went 2–8 in 2006 and improved in 2007 with a 3–7 record and in '08 finished 1–7 after two games were cancelled due to hurricane Ike. Cripps finished his career at NHS 6-22.

After coach Cripps' departure to district rival Stratford, the Raiders finished the 2009 season 0–10 led by new head coach Ron Rogers. In 2010 the UIL announced that Northbrook would be placed in district 17-4A along with Stratford, Spring Woods, Brenham, Montgomery, Waller, Magnolia, and Magnolia West. In their first season in 4A the Raiders finished the 2010 season 2–8. Ron Rogers finished his career at Northbrook with a 2–18 record. He was replaced by former offensive coordinator Dave Cope.

Soccer
The Northbrook Raider boys' soccer program has enjoyed some success in the last 14 seasons under Coach Justin Wheeler.  The Raiders have earned playoff appearances in 1999, 2000, 2003, 2004, 2007, 2011, 2012, 2013, 2014 and 2015.  They have made the state playoffs as representatives of class 4A, 5A and 6A. They were district champions in 2000, 2004, 2007, 2011 and 2012. They were a regional quarter-finalist in 2003 and a Regional Champion and 5A State Semi-Finalist in 2004. The Northbrook boys' soccer team competes in district 18AAAAAA along with Spring Woods, Stratford, Memorial, Klein,  Klein Forest,  Klein Collins and Klein Oak.

Feeder patterns
The following elementary schools feed into Northbrook High School
 Buffalo Creek
 Cedar Brook
 Edgewood
 Hollibrook
 Ridgecrest
 Spring Shadows
 Housman (partial)
 Pine Shadows (partial)
 Terrace (partial)

The following middle schools feed into Northbrook High School:
 Northbrook Middle School
 H. M. Landrum (partial)
 Spring Woods Middle School (partial)

Partnership
In 2015, YES Prep Northbrook opened inside of the campus. It's currently serving a full 9–12 grade campus. It's part of the SKY Partnership. These students take regular classes at YES Prep, but they join regular Northbrook students in extra-curricular activities

Notable alumni
Ty Allert, former NFL linebacker for the Philadelphia Eagles

Notes

External links
 Northbrook High School
 NHS Alumni Facebook page
 Northbrook High School Alumni

Public high schools in Houston
Spring Branch Independent School District high schools